James Herbert Benyon (born Fellowes; 1849–1935) was an early 20th-century Lord Lieutenant of Berkshire.

Early life

Born James Herbert Fellowes, he was the son of James Fellowes of Kingston Maurward House near Dorchester, Dorset who was the youngest son of William Henry Fellowes of Ramsey Abbey in Huntingdonshire by his wife, Emma the daughter of Richard Benyon of Gidea Hall in Essex. In 1897, he took the name of Benyon upon inheriting his uncle's estate at Englefield in Berkshire.

Career
He trained as a barrister and became High Sheriff of Dorset in 1892 and Lord Lieutenant of Berkshire in August 1901, a post he held until his death. He was also first chairman of the Berkshire Education Committee (1902 onwards), chairman of Berkshire County Council (1916–1926) and the first Chancellor of the University of Reading after it gained its charter in 1926. He was on the governing body of Abingdon School from 1902 until his death in 1934 and was the Chairman of the Governors from 1903 to 1927.

Personal life
By his wife Dame Edith Benyon GBE (née Walrond), he was the father of Sir Henry Benyon.

References

1849 births
1935 deaths
Lord-Lieutenants of Berkshire
People from Englefield, Berkshire
People from Dorchester, Dorset
Chancellors of the University of Reading
High Sheriffs of Dorset
Members of Berkshire County Council
Benyon family
Governors of Abingdon School